"Rockin' All Over the World" is a rock song written by John Fogerty, formerly of Creedence Clearwater Revival. It made its debut on Fogerty's second solo album in 1975.  It was also released as a single, spending six weeks in the US top 40, peaking at #27.

Status Quo recorded their own, heavier arrangement of Fogerty's song for their 1977 album Rockin' All Over the World. In July 1985 Status Quo opened Live Aid at Wembley Stadium with "Rockin' All Over the World".

Reception
Rolling Stone critic Dave Marsh considered the song a good choice for the album's lead single, although he claimed that it was "little more than the formulaic CCR sound with the title repeated over and over, like a chant." Billboard exclaimed "Good news for rock and roll fans. John Fogerty is back, capturing all the deceptively simple magic frantic feel that made Creedence a groundbreaking rock group in the '60s," praising the vocals, instrumentals and the title.  Cash Box said that "every kid in town should sit up and take note of the simple drive, and cutout all that complicated crud."

Status Quo version

During the recording of Status Quo's music video to the song, bassist Alan Lancaster was living in Australia. He had refused to return to the UK for the recording, so he was replaced by a dummy with a bass guitar in the video. Quo's version was their 8th UK top ten hit, peaking at #3.

At Live Aid, Status Quo began their set (and thus the event itself, being the opening band) with "Rockin' All Over the World" which first became an unofficial anthem for the event when the BBC used it to advertise their TV coverage. Coldplay performed a portion of the song at Live 8, with lead singer Chris Martin singing the chorus during the song "In My Place", after much was made of Status Quo's absence from the concert in the British media.

The song has found widespread usage in the sports world. In 1988, to support Sport Aid, Status Quo re-recorded the song as "Running All Over the World" with slightly amended lyrics. It reached #17 in the UK Singles Chart. In the 21st century, Status Quo's 1977 rendition has become both an anthem of English football and European football more broadly, including as German side Bayer Leverkusen's post-goal track (a song played over the PA system whenever a goal is scored by the home team). The song is played over the PA system after England international matches, to which the crowd sings along. It is also popular as a crowd chant, with both original and modified lyrics, at various clubs around England, including Arsenal (modified) and Millwall (original). 

Another re-recorded version by Status Quo - a cover of the original 1977 record - appeared on their album Riffs in 2003. The song was reprised once again, in 2014, for Status Quo's thirty-first studio album, Aquostic (Stripped Bare), as an acoustic arrangement. It was featured in the ninety-minute launch performance of the album at London's Roundhouse on 22 October, the concert being recorded and broadcast live by BBC Radio 2 as part of their In Concert series.

Weekly charts

Certifications

References

1975 songs
1975 singles
1977 singles
John Fogerty songs
Status Quo (band) songs
Songs written by John Fogerty
Song recordings produced by John Fogerty
Song recordings produced by Pip Williams
Irish Singles Chart number-one singles
Asylum Records singles
Vertigo Records singles